General Gibbs may refer to:

Alfred Gibbs (1823–1868), Union Army brigadier general and brevet major general
David Parker Gibbs (1911–1987), U.S. Army major general
Edward Gibbs (c. 1777–1847), British Army lieutenant general
George Sabin Gibbs (1875–1947), United States Army major general
Roland Gibbs (1921–2004), British Army general

See also
Alexander Gibb (1872–1958), British Army brigadier general
Frederick W. Gibb (1908–1968), U.S. Army major general
Attorney General Gibbs (disambiguation)